

Lufthansa Flight 502 was a scheduled flight from Hamburg, Germany to Buenos Aires, Argentina on 11 January 1959. The flight was being operated by a Lockheed L-1049G Super Constellation (registration D-ALAK). On the leg between Senegal and Brazil the Super Constellation was on approach to Rio de Janeiro–Galeão International Airport when it crashed near Flecheiras Beach just short of the runway. All 29 passengers and seven of the ten crew were killed. It was the first fatal accident involving the current Lufthansa since it was formed in 1955.

Accident
During the descent the weather was rainy. Descending too low on approach, the Constellation struck the water with the aircraft's nosewheel; the crew attempted to continue the approach, but were unable to maintain control, and the aircraft crashed near Flecheiras Beach. All of the aircraft's passengers (including both the literary impressaria Susana Soca and the Archduchess Maria Ileana of Austria-Tuscany, granddaughter of King Ferdinand of Romania, along with her husband) as well as seven crewmembers died; the co-pilot, a steward and a stewardess survived the impact.

Aircraft
The aircraft, a Lockheed L-1049G Super Constellation airliner powered by four Wright R-3350 radial piston engines, had been built in 1955, and was delivered to Lufthansa on 17 May 1955. The aircraft was sold to Seaboard World Airlines in May 1958, but had been returned to Lufthansa in November of that year.

Probable cause
An accident investigation was unable to determine the cause of the crash, but considered that the most likely cause of the accident was pilot error, resulting in Flight 502 descending below the minimum altitude required for the approach. The crew had exceeded the flight time limits set by Brazilian aeronautical regulations, but not under German rules; aircrew fatigue was determined to be a contributing factor.

See also
Other similar accidents:
 AIRES Flight 8250
 Asiana Airlines Flight 214
 Air Canada Flight 624
 Crossair Flight 3597
 Delta Air Lines Flight 723
 Lion Air Flight 904
 Smolensk air disaster
 Turkish Airlines Flight 1951
 Vietnam Airlines Flight 815

Other aviation accidents involving members of royalty:
 1937 Sabena Junkers Ju 52 Ostend crash
 1947 KLM Douglas DC-3 Copenhagen disaster
 Air France Flight 447

References
Citations

Bibliography

External links 
Accident description at the Aviation Safety Network

Accidents and incidents involving the Lockheed Constellation
Aviation accidents and incidents in 1959
Aviation accidents and incidents in Brazil
Airliner accidents and incidents involving controlled flight into terrain
502
1959 in Brazil